Aunt Louisa's Oft Told Tales is a book by Laura Valentine released in the 1870s and containing an abridged version of Robinson Crusoe as well as "Children in the Wood", "Hare and Tortoise" and other moral fables. Except for the elaborated "new version" of "The Tortoise and the Hare", the retellings are in verse.

References 

1870s short story collections
Children's short story collections
British short story collections
British children's books
1870s children's books
American children's books
American short story collections
Children's poetry books